Oulart (formerly Ubhallghort - "the orchard"), is a small village in the southeastern corner of Ireland. It is situated in County Wexford just off the R741 regional road halfway between the towns of Gorey to the north and Wexford to the south.

Raheenduff or "Black little fort" in English, is a small hamlet within the extremities of Oulart village and is home of Cooney's local grain store, village store and public house, which has been managed by the Redmond family since the 1950s. Two other townlands in Oulart, Kilnamanagh and Kyle, are home to businesses such as a plant nursery, pubs, SPAR supermarket, and auto services business.

Oulart had a population of 197 people in 2006, 257 in 2011, and 274 according to the 2016 census.

The Battle of Oulart Hill took place near Oulart during the 1798 rebellion.

Sport
The local Gaelic Athletic Association club, Oulart the Ballagh, fields hurling and camogie teams. The club has won the Wexford Senior Hurling Championship on thirteen occasions, most recently in 2016. It has twelve Wexford Senior Camogie Championship titles.

See also
 List of towns and villages in Ireland

References

Towns and villages in County Wexford